Clova/Lac Duchamp Water Aerodrome  is located on Lac Duchamp at Clova, Quebec, Canada. It is open from May to October.

References

Registered aerodromes in Mauricie
Seaplane bases in Quebec